Florida held various statewide elections on November 7, 2006.

Candidates
Candidates are listed in alphabetical order by last name. Incumbents appear in bold. Section links go to relevant pages on Florida government.

Governor 

The previous Republican governor was Jeb Bush.
 Charlie Crist and Jeff Kottkamp (Republican Party)
 Jim Davis and Daryl Jones (Democratic Party)
 Max Linn and Tom Macklin (Reform Party)
 Richard Paul Dembinsky and Dr. Joe Smith (No party)
 John Wayne Smith and James J. Kearney (No party)
 Karl C. C. Behm and Carol Castagnero (No party)

Result
Charlie Crist and Jeff Kottkamp were elected

United States Senate 

 Katherine Harris (Republican Party)
 Bill Nelson (Democratic Party)
 Brian Moore (NPA)
 Roy Tanner (NPA)
 Belinda Noah (NPA)
 Floyd Ray Frazier (NPA)

Result
Bill Nelson was re-elected

Attorney General 
 Skip Campbell (Democratic Party)
 Bill McCollum (Republican Party)

Result
Bill McCollum was elected

Chief Financial Officer 
 Tom Lee (Republican Party)
 Alex Sink (Democratic Party)

Commissioner of Agriculture 
 Charles Bronson (Republican Party)
 Eric Copeland (politician) (Democratic Party)

Judicial 
Florida voters had to choose whether or not each of the following will remain in office.

Justices of the Florida Supreme Court 
 R. Fred Lewis
 Barbara J. Pariente
 Peggy A. Quince

Florida District Courts of Appeal 
Voters had to choose whether to retain any of the judges in their circuit court.

First District Court of Appeal (Tallahassee) 
 Brad Thomas
 Peter Webster

Second District Court of Appeal (Lakeland/Tampa)

Third District Court of Appeal (Miami)

Fourth District Court of Appeal (West Palm Beach) 
 Bobby W. Gunther
 Fred A. Hazouri
 Larry A. Klein
 Barry J. Stone
 Carole Y. Taylor

Fifth District Court of Appeal (Daytona Beach)

Amendments to the Florida Constitution

No. 1: State Planning and Budget Process 
Official summary: Proposing amendments to the State Constitution to limit the amount of nonrecurring general revenue which may be appropriated for recurring purposes in any fiscal year to 3 percent of the total general revenue funds estimated to be available, unless otherwise approved by a three-fifths vote of the Legislature; to establish a Joint Legislative Budget Commission, which shall issue long-range financial outlooks; to provide for limited adjustments in the state budget without the concurrence of the full Legislature, as provided by general law; to reduce the number of times trust funds are automatically terminated; to require the preparation and biennial revision of a long-range state planning document; and to establish a Government Efficiency Task Force and specify its duties. Vote Smart Analysis: 

This Amendment passed!

No. 3: Requiring Broader Public Support for Constitutional Amendments or Revisions 
Official summary: Proposes an amendment to Section 5 of Article XI of the State Constitution to require that any proposed amendment to or revision of the State Constitution, whether proposed by the Legislature, by initiative, or by any other method, must be approved by at least 60 percent of the voters of the state voting on the measure, rather than by a simple majority. This proposed amendment would not change the current requirement that a proposed constitutional amendment imposing a new state tax or fee be approved by at least 2/3 of the voters of the state voting in the election in which such an amendment is considered.  Vote Smart Analysis: 

This Amendment passed!

No. 4: Protect People Especially Youth, From Addiction, Disease, and Other Health Hazards of Using Tobacco 
Official summary: To protect people, especially youth, from addiction, disease, and other health hazards of using tobacco, the Legislature shall use some Tobacco Settlement money annually for a comprehensive statewide tobacco education and prevention program using Centers for Disease Control best practices. Specifies some program components, emphasizing youth, requiring one-third of total annual funding for advertising. Annual funding is 15% of 2005 Tobacco Settlement payments to Florida, adjusted annually for inflation. Provides definitions. Effective immediately.  Vote Smart Analysis: 

This Amendment passed!

No. 6: Increased Homestead Exemption 
Official summary: Proposing amendment of the State Constitution to increase the maximum additional homestead exemption for low-income seniors from $25,000 to $50,000 and to schedule the amendment to take effect January 1, 2007.  Vote Smart Analysis: 

This Amendment passed!

No. 7: Permanently Disabled Veterans' Discount on Homestead Ad Valorem Tax 
Official summary: Proposing an amendment to the State Constitution to provide a discount from amount of ad valorem tax on homestead of a partially or totally permanently disabled veteran who is age 65 or older who was a Florida resident at the time of entering military service, whose disability was combat-related, and who was honorably discharged, to specify percentage of the discount as equal to the percentage of veteran’s permanent service-connected disability; to specify qualification requirements for the discount; to authorize the Legislature to waive the annual application requirement in subsequent years by general law; and to specify that the provision takes effect December 7, 2006, is self-executing, and does not require implementing legislation.  Vote Smart Analysis: 

This Amendment passed!

No. 8: Eminent Domain 
Official summary: Proposing an amendment to the State Constitution to prohibit the transfer of private property taken by eminent domain to a natural person or private entity, providing that the Legislature may by general law passed by a three-fifths vote of the membership of each house of the Legislature permit exceptions allowing the transfer of such private property; and providing that this prohibition on the transfer of private property taken by eminent domain is applicable if the petition of taking that initiated the condemnation proceeding was filed on or after January 2, 2007.  Vote Smart Analysis: 

This Amendment passed!

See also 
 Florida congressional elections, 2006
 Florida United States Senate election, 2006
 Government of Florida

External links 
 FLA Politics
 Vote Smart Florida - a nonpartisan description of the proposed constitutional amendments
 O'Blog: Florida campaign websites

 
Florida